The arrondissement of Vannes is an arrondissement of France in the Morbihan department in the Brittany region. It has 99 communes.

Composition

The communes of the arrondissement of Vannes, and their INSEE codes, are:
 
 Allaire (56001)
 Ambon (56002)
 Arradon (56003)
 Arzal (56004)
 Arzon (56005)
 Augan (56006)
 Baden (56008)
 Béganne (56011)
 Beignon (56012)
 Berric (56015)
 Billiers (56018)
 Bohal (56020)
 Bono (56262)
 Brandivy (56022)
 Caden (56028)
 Camoël (56030)
 Carentoir (56033)
 Caro (56035)
 Colpo (56042)
 Cournon (56044)
 Le Cours (56045)
 Damgan (56052)
 Elven (56053)
 Férel (56058)
 Les Fougerêts (56060)
 La Gacilly (56061)
 Grand-Champ (56067)
 Guer (56075)
 Le Guerno (56077)
 Le Hézo (56084)
 Île-aux-Moines (56087)
 Île-d'Arz (56088)
 Larmor-Baden (56106)
 Larré (56108)
 Lauzach (56109)
 Limerzel (56111)
 Lizio (56112)
 Locmaria-Grand-Champ (56115)
 Locqueltas (56120)
 Malansac (56123)
 Malestroit (56124)
 Marzan (56126)
 Meucon (56132)
 Missiriac (56133)
 Molac (56135)
 Monteneuf (56136)
 Monterblanc (56137)
 Muzillac (56143)
 Nivillac (56147)
 Noyal-Muzillac (56149)
 Péaule (56153)
 Peillac (56154)
 Pénestin (56155)
 Plaudren (56157)
 Plescop (56158)
 Pleucadeuc (56159)
 Ploeren (56164)
 Plougoumelen (56167)
 Pluherlin (56171)
 Porcaro (56180)
 Questembert (56184)
 Réminiac (56191)
 Rieux (56194)
 La Roche-Bernard (56195)
 Rochefort-en-Terre (56196)
 Ruffiac (56200)
 Saint-Abraham (56202)
 Saint-Armel (56205)
 Saint-Avé (56206)
 Saint-Congard (56211)
 Saint-Dolay (56212)
 Saint-Gildas-de-Rhuys (56214)
 Saint-Gorgon (56216)
 Saint-Gravé (56218)
 Saint-Guyomard (56219)
 Saint-Jacut-les-Pins (56221)
 Saint-Jean-la-Poterie (56223)
 Saint-Laurent-sur-Oust (56224)
 Saint-Malo-de-Beignon (56226)
 Saint-Marcel (56228)
 Saint-Martin-sur-Oust (56229)
 Saint-Nicolas-du-Tertre (56230)
 Saint-Nolff (56231)
 Saint-Perreux (56232)
 Saint-Vincent-sur-Oust (56239)
 Sarzeau (56240)
 Séné (56243)
 Sérent (56244)
 Sulniac (56247)
 Surzur (56248)
 Théhillac (56250)
 Theix-Noyalo (56251)
 Le Tour-du-Parc (56252)
 Tréal (56253)
 Trédion (56254)
 Treffléan (56255)
 La Trinité-Surzur (56259)
 Vannes (56260)
 La Vraie-Croix (56261)

History

The arrondissement of Vannes was created in 1800. At the January 2017 reorganisation of the arrondissements of Morbihan, it gained two communes from the arrondissement of Lorient, and it lost 21 communes to the arrondissement of Pontivy.

As a result of the reorganisation of the cantons of France which came into effect in 2015, the borders of the cantons are no longer related to the borders of the arrondissements. The cantons of the arrondissement of Vannes were, as of January 2015:

 Allaire
 Elven
 La Gacilly
 Grand-Champ
 Guer
 Malestroit
 Mauron
 Muzillac
 Ploërmel
 Questembert
 La Roche-Bernard
 Rochefort-en-Terre
 Sarzeau
 La Trinité-Porhoët
 Vannes-Centre
 Vannes-Est
 Vannes-Ouest

References

Vannes